TBX20 (gene)
is a member of the T-box family that encodes the transcription factor TBX20. Studies in mouse, human and fruitfly have shown that this gene is essential for early heart development, adult heart function and yolk sac vasculature remodeling and has been associated with congenital heart diseases. Tbx20 was also shown to be required for migration of hindbrain motor neurons and in facial neurons was proposed to be a positive regulator of the non-canonical Wnt signaling pathway.

Tbx20 is a transcription factor that is essential for proper heart development in a growing fetus. Any mutations in this gene can result in various forms of congenital heart disease. One of the more serious examples is the presence of a septal defect. The interatrial septum is a piece of tissue that separates the left and right atria of the heart, which contain oxygenated and deoxygenated blood, respectively. In Tbx20 mutants, this divider does not form and results in deoxygenated blood flowing into the left atrium then left ventricle, which ships the blood to the organs and muscles. Since deoxygenated blood should not be delivered to the tissues, the result is cyanosis, or a bluish skin discoloration stemming from low oxygen concentration. Proper function of Tbx20 is essential because it controls other genes that regulate cardiomyocyte proliferation, such as Tbx2 and N-myc1. Cardiomyocytes are the basis for the correct architectural scheme of the heart, and if defects arise in these structures, proper heart development is likely unattainable.

Embryonic heart functions 

Tbx20 knockout mouse embryos die at around or before E10.5 with hypoplastic hearts.

This gene has been implicated in coordinating cardiac proliferation, regional specification and formation of the cardiac chamber Congenital heart diseases involving TBX20 include defects in septation, chamber growth and valvulogenesis and increased Tbx20 expression was shown to cause congenital atrial septal defects, patent foramen ovale and cardiac valve defects.

Adult heart functions

In the fruitfly, knock-down of mid (midline), Drosophila's Tbx20 homolog gene, led to slower heart rate, arrythmias and abnormal myofibrillar architecture. Heterozygous Tbx20 knockout adult mice displayed left ventricle dilation, decreased wall thickness and contractile abnormalities.
Homozygous conditional cardiomyocyte Tbx20 knockout adult mice died within 15 days after knockout induction. Mice hearts presented with dilated cardiomyopathy and contraction-related dysfunctions such as abnormal atrioventricular conduction, slower heart rate, altered ventricular depolarization/repolarization and arrhythmias.

Known co-factors 

Transcription factors GATA4 and NKX2-5 have been shown to physically interact with TBX20 and enhance gene expression.

Known downstream gene targets 

Tbx2 was shown to be directly repressed by Tbx20 in the myocardium. Analysis of data from genome-wide chromatin immunoprecipitation against TBX20 tagged with green fluorescent protein in adult (6–8 weeks) mouse whole heart, coupled with analysis of genes differentially expressed upon loss of Tbx20, identified hundreds of putative TBX20 direct targets.

References

External links 
 Human UniProt entry
 Mouse UniProt entry
 WikiGenes entry

Transcription factors